Michael John Lucero (September 26, 1963 – May 8, 1998) was an American music video director.  He died in a car accident in Nevada on May 8, 1998.

Xzibit dedicated his 1998 video for “What U See Is What U Get” to Lucero.

Videography

1991
 Del tha Funkee Homosapien — "Sleepin' on My Couch"
 Del tha Funkee Homosapien — "Dr. Bombay"

1993
 Da King and I - "Tears"
 Private Investigators - "Who am I? (God)"
 Leaders of the New School — "What's Next"
 Too Short — "I'm a Player"
 KRS-One — "Sound of da Police"
 Souls of Mischief — "93 'til Infinity"
 Common – "Breaker 1/9"

1994
 Leaders of the New School — "Classic Material"
 Boogiemonsters — "Strange"
 Boogiemonsters — "Recognized Thresholds of Negative Stress"
 Black Sheep — "Without a Doubt"
 Organized Konfusion — "Stress"
 Luna — "This Time Around"
 Kurious — "I'm Kurious"
 Da Bush Babees — "Swing It"
Rampage — "Beware Of The Rampsack"

1995
 Tha Alkaholiks — "The Next Level"
 Deadeye Dick — "Paralyze Me"
 Dream Warriors — "California Dreamin'"

1996
 Busta Rhymes featuring Ol' Dirty Bastard — "Woo Hah!! Got You All in Check" [The Worldwide Remix]
 Dru Down - ''Can You Feel Me''
 Xzibit — "Paparazzi"
 Art n' Soul — "Ever Since You Went Away"
 Dog Eat Dog — "Isms"
 Nine — "Lyin' King"
 Ginuwine — "Pony"
 Xzibit — "The Foundation"
 Richie Rich — "Let's Ride"

1997
 Luniz — "Jus Mee & U"
 Shelter — "Whole Wide World"
 Bounty Killer featuring Fugees — "Hip-Hopera"
 Jonny Lang — "Lie to Me"
 Dr. Dre — "Kush"
 Ginuwine — "Tell Me Do U Wanna"
 The O'Jays — "What's Stopping You"
 Next — "Butta Love"
 Ginuwine — "When Doves Cry"
 Jonny Lang — "Missing Your Love"
 The Honeyrods — "Love Bee"

References

1963 births
1998 deaths
People from San Jose, California
American music video directors
Road incident deaths in Nevada